Abraham Lake is a lake in South Dakota, in the United States.

Abraham Lake bears the name of a local Native American family.

See also
List of lakes in South Dakota

References

Lakes of South Dakota
Lakes of Marshall County, South Dakota